Trần Khoa Điển (born 25 February 1987) is a Vietnamese footballer who plays as a goalkeeper for V-League (Vietnam) club Dong Thap FC. He was invited by other teams like Binh Dinh, but he chose to play with his home team.

References

1987 births
Living people
Vietnamese footballers
V.League 1 players
Association football goalkeepers
Footballers at the 2010 Asian Games
Dong Thap FC players
Sportspeople from Ho Chi Minh City
Asian Games competitors for Vietnam